Love & Hip Hop: New York (originally known as simply Love & Hip Hop) is the original installment of the Love & Hip Hop reality television franchise on VH1. The series premiered on March 6, 2011, and chronicles the lives of several people in New York City (and nearby areas, including New Jersey, and Yonkers), involved with hip hop music.

Series overview

Episodes

Season 1 (2011)

Season 2 (2011–12)

Season 3 (2013)

Season 4 (2013–14)

Season 5 (2014–15)

Season 6 (2015–16)

Season 7 (2016–17)

Season 8 (2017–18)

Season 9 (2018–19)

Season 10 (2019–20)

Specials

Ratings

References

External links

Love & Hip Hop
Lists of American reality television series episodes